Hobro Idræts Klub is a professional association football club based in the town of Hobro, Denmark, that competes in the 1st Division, the second tier of the Danish football league system. 

Founded in 1913, it is known by the short names 'Hobro IK' or 'HIK' and affiliated to DBU Jutland. The team plays its home matches at Hobro Stadium, named DS Arena for sponsorship reasons. The club won the 2016–17 Danish 1st Division.

Squad

Current squad

Youth players in use 2022/23

Managers
 Søren Kusk (2007–2008)
 Calle Facius (2008)
 Søren Kusk (2008–2010)
 Jan Østergaard (2010)
 Jens Hammer Sørensen (2010)
 Jakob Michelsen (2011–2012)
 Klavs Rasmussen (2012–2013)
 Jonas Dal (2013–2015)
 Ove Pedersen (2015–2016)
 Thomas Thomasberg (2017–2018)
 Allan Kuhn (2018–2019)
 Peter Sørensen (2019–2021)
 Michael Kryger (2021)
 Martin Thomsen (2021–present)

References

External links
 

Football clubs in Denmark
1913 establishments in Denmark
Association football clubs established in 1913